The International Federation of Independent Revolutionary Art (FIARI) was a short-lived organization established in 1938 following the publication of the Manifesto for an Independent Revolutionary Art, which was signed by André Breton and Diego Rivera, based on their political and cultural rejection of the Communist International. It was likely co-authored by Leon Trotsky.

History 
In April 1938, André Breton travelled to Mexico on a grant from France's Ministry of Foreign Affairs. There, he became acquainted with Leon Trotsky and co-authored the Manifesto with him. The published Manifesto was signed by Breton and Rivera.

The document called for the establishment of an International Federation of Independent Revolutionary Art. On Breton's return to France, he established the Federation, setting up branches in Paris, London and New York, as well as Mexico. Breton successfully solicited supported for the project from the likes of Benjamin Péret, Yves Tanguy, André Masson, Victor Serge, Marcel Martinet, Ignazio Silone, Herbert Read (who, in turn, won the support of George Orwell) and others.

However, the Federation was beset with problems. Only two editions of La Clé, the monthly bulletin of the Federation's French section, were published before publication was ceased in February 1939 amid a deepening political crisis across Europe. In his last letter to Trotsky in June 1939, Breton wrote: "Perhaps I am not very talented as an organizer, but at the same time it seems to me that I have run up against enormous obstacles."

Sources

External links
 Manifesto for an Independent Revolutionary Art

1938 in politics
1938 documents
Political manifestos
Works by André Breton
Works about surrealism